William Mervin McKinney III (born June 5, 1955) is a retired American professional basketball player, former radio broadcaster, and the current mayor of Zion, Illinois.  Due to his quickness he was nicknamed "The Crazed Hummingbird".

A 6'0" guard, McKinney attended Zion-Benton High School where he played for Mo Tharp (long time Fremd coach), and Northwestern University; he earned a degree in education. He was the Wildcats' all-time leading scorer for 35 years until John Shurna surpassed him in February 2012. From 1978 to 1986 McKinney played in the National Basketball Association as a member of the Kansas City Kings, Utah Jazz, Denver Nuggets, San Diego Clippers, and Chicago Bulls. He averaged 8.0 points per game and 3.5 assists per game in his NBA career.

McKinney later served as Assistant Vice President of Basketball Operations for the Bulls, Director of Player Personnel for the Minnesota Timberwolves, Vice President of Basketball Operations (Detroit Pistons), and Executive Vice President of the NBA's Seattle SuperSonics and the same position for the WNBA's Seattle Storm. In his previous position he was the radio color analyst for the NBA's Minnesota Timberwolves. In June 2008, McKinney was hired by fellow Zion-Benton alumnus John Hammond as the Milwaukee Bucks' Director of Scouting. In 2015, he was named Vice-President of Scouting.

McKinney was elected as Zion's mayor in April 2019.

Notes

External links
 Billy-McKinney.com, McKinney's official website
 
 Timberwolves Broadcasting Crew at NBA.com
  Election Results
  Mayor McKinney's about page - City of Zion, Illinois

1955 births
Living people
African-American basketball players
African-American sports executives and administrators
American men's basketball players
American sports executives and administrators
Basketball players from Illinois
Chicago Bulls players
Dallas Mavericks expansion draft picks
Denver Nuggets players
Kansas City Kings players
Minnesota Timberwolves announcers
National Basketball Association executives
Northwestern University School of Education and Social Policy alumni
Northwestern Wildcats men's basketball players
Phoenix Suns draft picks
Point guards
San Diego Clippers players
Sportspeople from Waukegan, Illinois
Utah Jazz players
21st-century African-American people
20th-century African-American sportspeople
African-American mayors in Illinois
Women's National Basketball Association general managers